Dvorak is a customizable card game that begins with a deck of blank index cards. These index cards (or pieces of paper or cardboard) are written and drawn upon by players before or during the game. Alternatively, games of Dvorak can be played online via a MUSH or the Thoth card game engine.

Rules 
The game revolves around two types of cards: Actions, which are discarded when played, and Things, which remain in play on the table in front of whoever played them.

The winner is determined by the rules of the deck being used. Winning often requires a player to achieve a certain goal or play a certain card, but every deck is different. Some decks allow players to be eliminated; in these, the winner is usually the last player remaining.

Creating cards 

Decks are made either before or during a game. When a card is created it is immediately shown to all players for their approval, halting play if necessary. A card is shuffled into the draw pile if it's accepted unanimously; if not, it is rejected and is set aside without affecting the game. If opposing sides refuse to approve individual cards, multiple cards may be lumped together into a single approve-or-reject vote.

Playing 
To start a game, shuffle the cards into a face-down draw pile and clear a space for the face-up discard pile to come. Deal five cards to each player, then decide who goes first, via rock paper scissors, flipping a coin, rolling a die, etc. Play proceeds clockwise (unless the deck or a card states otherwise) until someone wins.

A player draws one card to begin their turn. They may then play an Action and/or a Thing. Their turn is then over and they must discard down to five cards if they have more than five.

If the draw pile is ever empty when someone needs to draw from it, the discard pile is shuffled to form a new one. If the discard pile is also empty, however, players must simply continue without drawing anything. When all the cards are played and there are none left, anyone without cards is out of the game, occasionally resulting in a draw.

Special rules 
Some decks contain "special rules" which alter the basic ones. These may decrease hand sizes to three cards, for example, or may even create a card type other than Actions and Things. While infinitely versatile, these are most often used to tell players how to win.

When created, special rules are proposed and accepted as normal cards are. However, they are set aside, not shuffled into the draw pile, if they are accepted.  They do not count as "cards" for the purposes of interpreting rules.

Rule and card conflicts 
Some cards can bend the rules. For example, if someone plays a card that says "draw three cards to start your turn", the basic "draw one" rule no longer applies to them.

Beyond that, if one card denies something and another permits it, the denial takes precedence (e.g., "nobody can draw cards" trumps "draw a card"). If cards contradict each other on the same issue, the more specific one takes precedence (e.g., "this player's hand size is seven" trumps "everyone's hand size is four"). Finally, if contradictory cards are equally specific, the last-played one takes precedence.

Special rules count as cards for conflict resolution purposes. As such, they always take precedence over the basic rules, but they may be overruled by other cards.

See also
1000 Blank White Cards
Fluxx

External links
Official Dvorak site — Contains the full set of rules and numerous popular decks that can be printed out and played.
 Dvorak decks for the Thoth engine

Card games introduced in 2000
Dedicated deck card games